Kenneth Leo Brodziak OBE (31 May 19133 June 1999), known early in his career as Richard R. Raymon and nicknamed "Mr Show Business", was an Australian entrepreneur, theatre and concert promoter, producer and artist manager. His career lasted from the mid-1940s until his retirement in 1980.

Life and career 

Kenn Brodziak was born in the Sydney suburb of Waverley. Although his family wanted him to have a law career, Brodziak was more interested in theatre and aspired to be a playwright. He started his career in 1945 as an assistant producer on the local vaudeville circuit. Over his long career, through his Melbourne-based company Aztec Services (1946-1979) and subsequently through J. C. Williamson Productions (1976-1980), he arranged concerts and tours by a wide range of acts both local and international, including Winifred Atwell, Gene Pitney, Marlene Dietrich, the Kinks, Sophie Tucker, Normie Rowe, Carol Channing, the Seekers, the Easybeats, Pat Boone, Fabian, Sid James, Cilla Black, the Dave Clark Five, Duane Eddy, Robert Morley, Bob Dylan, Lonnie Donegan, Cliff Richard, Dave Brubeck, Marcel Marceau, Eartha Kitt and Jack Benny. His bringing of the BBC's Black and White Minstrel Show for an intended six-month tour of both Australia and New Zealand was an unprecedented success, eventually lasting for over for three years from 1962 to 1965 and breaking box office records in both countries which still stand. He was also the second manager of pop singer John Farnham and casting him in role sin local versions of musicals Charlie Girl and Pippin.

His major competitor was Harry M. Miller, whom he subsequently joined with Stadium Limited to form Miller-Aztec Stadiums and promoted tours by the Animals, the Monkees and the "Big Show Tour" of 1968 headlined by rock group the Who.

The Beatles' Australian tour
Brodziak's most notable achievement was arranging the Beatles' 16-day Australian tour in 1964 during their world tour. He had seen the Beatles perform during a talent-scouting trip to Britain in 1963 and agreed to handle and promote the group's Australian tour, just prior to the explosion of Beatlemania in Australia, for Stadiums Limited which owned most of the large capital city venues including the Brisbane Festival Hall, the Festival Hall in Melbourne, Centennial Hall in Adelaide and Sydney Stadium. By the time the Beatles arrived in Australia they had become international stars, having already scored 12 hits on the Australian pop charts. The tour was a great success, bringing Brodziak a level of fame in Australia he had never previously experienced. In 1998, he acknowledged that, in spite of his many other achievements, bringing the Beatles to Australia was probably the most memorable:

"It used to annoy me that people only knew me for bringing The Beatles here. Now I realise what a landmark moment that was. There will never be another group like them."

Theatre productions
Though Brodziak would continue to book concerts, later in his career he also concentrated on producing stage shows.  These shows included the successful Australian productions of The Boys in the Band, Godspell, Pippin, Hair and A Chorus Line. After retiring in 1980, he concentrated on adding to and developing his extensive collection of showbiz memorabilia.

Honours
Brodziak was appointed an Officer of the Order of the British Empire (OBE) in 1978 for services to theatre.

Along with Edna Edgley, Brodziak was the JC Williamson Award recipient for lifetime achievement in 1998.

References

1913 births
1999 deaths
Impresarios
Australian theatre managers and producers
Australian people of Polish descent
Helpmann Award winners
Australian Officers of the Order of the British Empire
Royal Australian Air Force personnel of World War II
People from New South Wales
Royal Australian Air Force officers